The 2019 WFG Tankard (French: Tankard WFG 2019) the Quebec men's provincial curling championship was held from January 13 to 20 at the Arèna de Grand-Mère in Grand-Mère, Quebec. The winning Martin Crête team represented Quebec at the 2019 Tim Hortons Brier in Brandon, Manitoba.

The event was held in conjunction with the 2019 Quebec Scotties Tournament of Hearts, Quebec's provincial women's curling championship.

The Martin Crête skipped rink (which had been skipped by 11-time provincial champion Jean-Michel Ménard in 2018 before he retired) won the event, defeating the 2018 champion Mike Fournier rink in the final.

Teams
Teams were as follows

Preliminary round

Standings

Scores
The scores for the preliminary round were as follows:

January 13
Draw 1
Fournier 8-5 Munroe 
Ferland 10-7 Hill
Martel 11-7 Jo. Stewart

Draw 2
Crête 11-5 Homan
Roy 9-1 Michaud
Gagné 9-3 Holdaway

January 14
Draw 3
Jo. Stewart 7-0 Munroe
Ferland 8-4 Je. Stewart
Martel 10-6 Hill

Draw 4
Homan 7-4 Holdaway
Roy 7-5 Bédard
Gagné 7-1 Michaud

Draw 5
Je. Stewart 12-5 Martel
Fournier 8-5 Jo. Stewart
Munroe 9-3 Hill

Draw 6
Gagné 6-2 Bédard
Crête 10-2 Holdaway
Homan 6-4 Michaud

January 15
Draw 7
Jo. Stewart 7-6 Hill
Ferland 9-7 Munroe
Fournier 10-3 Je. Stewart

Draw 8
Michaud 5-3 Holdaway
Roy 12-7 Homan
Crête 11-3 Bédard

Draw 9
Fournier 10-3 Martel
Hill 5-4 Je. Stewart
Ferland 9-4 Jo. Stewart 4

Draw 10
Crête 10-9 Gagné
Bédard 9-5 Michaud
Roy 8-6 Holdaway

January 16
Draw 11
Roy 9-6 Gagné
Crête 10-0 Michaud
Bédard 8-7 Homan

Draw 12
Martel 6-4 Ferland
Fournier 11-3 Hill
Munroe 8-7 Je. Stewart

Draw 13
Bédard 11-6 Holdaway
Roy 6-5 Crête 
Homan 9-3 Gagné

Draw 14
Je. Stewart 7-6 Jo. Stewart
Fournier 8-2 Ferland
Munroe 9-7 Martel

Tiebreakers
January 17, 09:00
Homan 7-2 Gagné
Munroe 5-4 Martel

Championship round

Standings

Scores

January 17
Draw 15
Crête  10-6 Ferland
Roy 7-4 Munroe
Fournier 9-7 Homan

Draw 16
Homan 8-3 Munroe
Fournier 7-4 Crête 
Roy 11-4 Ferland

January 18
Draw 17
Roy 7-5 Fournier
Homan 8-2 Ferland
Crête 8-2 Munroe

Playoffs

1 vs 2
Friday, January 19, 09:00

3 vs 4
Friday, January 19, 09:00

Semifinal
Saturday, January 19, 15:00

Final
Sunday, January 20, 13:00

References

External links
Official website

Quebec Men's Provincial Curling Championship
Curling competitions in Quebec
Quebec Men's Provincial
WFG Tankard
Shawinigan